Six ships of the Royal Navy have borne the name HMS Avon. Avon comes from a Brythonic word meaning "river".

  was an 18-gun  launched in 1805. In 1814 she was sunk in action with the American Wasp in the English Channel. 
  was a 2-gun wooden paddle package ship transferred from the GPO to the Royal Navy in 1837. From 1843 she was used as a survey ship and she was sold in 1863.
  was a 2-gun wooden paddle gunboat purchased in 1862. She was used in the New Zealand Wars and was sold in 1865 as a coal hulk. She later became the civilian vessel Clyde.
  was a 4-gun composite screw gun vessel launched in 1867. She was sold in 1890.
  was a destroyer launched in 1896. She was sold in 1920.
  was a  launched in 1943. She was handed over to the Portuguese Navy in 1949 where she was renamed Nuno Tristao. She was broken up in 1970.

References
 

Royal Navy ship names